Wight Bank is a small, wholly submerged atoll structure in the Southwest of the Chagos Archipelago, Indian Ocean.
. The closest piece of land is Île Sudest of Egmont Atoll, at  NNW.

Wight Bank was first reported in 1886.

References

External links
Indian Ocean Pilot

Chagos Archipelago